Hey Shawty may refer to:
"Hey Shawty", a song on 613: Ashy to Classy
"Hey Shawty", a song on Self Explanatory